The Brass Check is a lost 1918 American silent comedy-drama film directed by Will S. Davis and starring Francis X. Bushman and Beverly Bayne. Metro Pictures produced and distributed the film.

Plot
As described in a film magazine, ordered out of the family home because he refused to marry the woman selected by this father Silas Trevor (Currier), Richard Trevor (Bushman) finds himself out in the world without funds or a way of earning some. Becoming a detective, he finds a suitcase check and follows this clue to a private insane asylum. There he helps Henry Everett (Joyner) escape. Richard than assists Everett and his sister Edith (Bayne) across the state line, but then returns to line up the men who made Everett their victim. Richard is surprised to find that his own father was at the bottom of the scheme, and that Everett was being held at the asylum because he had discovered a method of manufacturing rubber but refused to sell it. In a clever way Richard has his father pay a high price for Everett's patent, and then introduces Edith as future wife.

Cast
Francis X. Bushman as Richard Trevor
Beverly Bayne as Edith Everett
Augustus Phillips as Wellington Dix
Frank Currier as Silas Trevor
Ollie Cooper as Norma Glanor
Francis Joyner as Henry Everett (credited as Frank Joyner)
Rudolph De Cordova as Cornelius Everett
Bob Williamson as Peter Glanor (credited as Robert Williamson)
Hugh Jeffrey as Blake
John Smiley as William Roberts
Hugh d'Arcy as J. Osborne Cole
Jack Newton as Robert Dexler
Syn De Conde

Reception
Like many American films of the time, The Brass Check was subject to cuts by city and state film censorship boards. For example, the Chicago Board of Censors required a cut, in Reel 2, of the boy picking up a pocketbook and running to corner with the same, Reel 4, closeup of man taking rings and following view of him placing them in pocket, and the closeup of an open drawer showing money and following scene with burglar placing money in pockets.

References

External links
 

1918 films
American silent feature films
Metro Pictures films
Films based on short fiction
Lost American films
American black-and-white films
1910s English-language films
1918 comedy-drama films
1918 lost films
Lost comedy-drama films
1910s American films
Silent American comedy-drama films